Ashoknagar Assembly constituency is an assembly constituency in North 24 Parganas district in the Indian state of West Bengal.

Overview
As per orders of the Delimitation Commission, No. 101 Ashoknagar Assembly constituency is composed of the following: Ashoknagar Kalyangarh municipality, and Habra II community development block.

Ashoknagar Assembly constituency is part of No. 17 Barasat (Lok Sabha constituency).

Members of Legislative Assembly

Election results

2021
In this Election AITC candidate won the seat

2016

2011
In the 2011 election, Dhiman Roy of Trinamool Congress defeated his nearest rival Satyasebi Kar of CPI(M).

.# Swing calculated on Congress+Trinamool Congress vote percentages taken together in 2006.

2006
In the 2006 election, Satyasebi Kar of CPI(M) defeated his nearest rival Dhiman Roy of All India Trinamool Congress .

1967–1972
Keshab Chandra Bhattacharya, Independent, won in 1972. Nani Kar of CPI(M) won in 1971. Sadhan Kumar Sen of CPI won in 1969 and 1967. Prior to that the Ashoknagar seat was not there.

1977–2006
In the 2006 state assembly elections, Satyasebi Kar of CPI(M) won the Ashoknagar assembly seat defeating his nearest rival Dhiman Roy of Trinamool Congress. Contests in most years were multi cornered but only winners and runners are being mentioned. Sarmistha Dutta of CPI(M) defeated Ashok Krishna Dutt of Trinamool Congress in 2001. Badal Bhattacharya of BJP defeated Rekha Goswami of CPIM in the 1999 Bye election, caused by the death of sitting MLA, Nirode Roy Chowdhury. Nirode Roy Choudhury of CPI(M) defeated Dhiman Roy of Congress in 1996. Nani Kar of CPI(M) defeated Keshab Chandra Bhattacharya of Congress/ Independent in 1991, 1987, 1982 and 1977.

References

Assembly constituencies of West Bengal
Politics of North 24 Parganas district
1967 establishments in West Bengal
Constituencies established in 1967